Coots in the North is the name given by Arthur Ransome's biographer, Hugh Brogan, to an incomplete Swallows and Amazons novel found in Ransome's papers. Brogan edited and published the first few chapters as a fragment with a selection of Ransome's other short stories in 1988. The story starts in the Broads but continues in the Lake District after the Death and Glories hitch a ride aboard a boat being delivered to the Lake in the North.

Plot summary

The Death and Glories are bored because the salvage business is in decline on the Broads. They see a boat being loaded for delivery to the Lake in the North where the Swallows, Amazons and Ds have their adventures, and Joe (without consulting Bill or Pete) decides that they will go along for the ride to see the Lake. They get left behind at a stop near the Lake,  make their way to the lake, and find that the lorry has already left for Norfolk and they have no way to get home. They meet the owner of the boat who takes them to find the Ds. They encounter the Swallows, Amazons and Ds sailing on the lake and make an attempt to rescue Nancy after her boat capsizes.

At this point the story as published ends, though notes indicate that Ransome was struggling to develop a suitable plot line and a way of arranging for the Death and Glories to get home without their impoverished parents having to pay the fare.

Various scenarios are mentioned, including the salvage of Captain Flint's houseboat when its anchor chain breaks in a squall. In gratitude Captain Flint pays for their return journey and gives them a reward.

In 2011 the Arthur Ransome Society's journal Mixed Moss held a competition for the best outline of a plot to complete the book, but (writing in 2021) no author has yet been commissioned by Ransome's estate to do so. Prior to this in 2009 a synopsis of a continuation of the story was published in Mixed Moss, "Ship's Girl" (Anon), the literary journal of the Arthur Ransome Society. A winner of the 2011 competition was never announced, so the book remains uncompleted.

Other Stories
Coots in the North also includes two extracts that Hugh Brogan rescued from an unfinished Victorian ‘Bevis’-style novel, a fishing tale called "The River Comes First", plus several short stories that Arthur Ransome published in magazines:
"The River Comes First" and "The Cloudburst"
"The Unofficial Side" is the only story he wrote involving the Russian Revolution. It is related by Hurst, a paid hand in a small private yacht.
"Two Shorts and a Long" also involves Hurst and is set on the yacht. 
"The Shepherd’s Pipe" (previously unpublished)  and "Ankou" are grim tales set among the peasants of Russia and Brittany (Ankou is the personification of Death in Brittany).

References

Sources
Coots in the North and Other Stories (Ed. Hugh Brogan, Jonathan Cape 1998).

1988 British novels
Swallows and Amazons series
Unfinished novels
Novels published posthumously
Novels set in Norfolk
Novels set in the Lake District
Jonathan Cape books
1988 children's books
1988 short story collections